The Sutra of the Wise and the Fool is a collection of tales translated from Central Asian languages into Chinese in the 4th century and then translated by Chos-Grub (法成) into Tibetan in the 9th century. The simple plot lines of these tales has made them popular readings in first year Tibetan courses.

References 
Mair, Victor H. (1993). "The Linguistic and Textual Antecedents of The Sūtra of the Wise and the Foolish", Sino-Platonic Papers 38.
Roesler, Ulrike (2007). “Materialien zur Redaktionsgeschichte des mDzangs blun: Die Selbstaufopferung des Prinzen Sujāta.” Indica et Tibetica. Michael Hahn felicitation volume. Edited by Konrad Klaus and Jens‐Uwe Hartmann. Wien 2007: 405‐422. (Wiener Studien zur Tibetologie und Buddhismuskunde 66.)
Schiefner, Anton (1852). Ergänzungen und Berichtigungen zu Schmidt's Ausgabe des Dsanglun. St. Petersburg: Buchdruckerei der Kaiserlichen Akademie der Wissenschaften
Schmidt, Jakob (1843). Der Weise und der Thor, Leipzig: Leopold Voss, vol.1, vol.2 
Takakusu, Junjirō (1901) "Tales of the Wise Man and the Fool, in Tibetan and Chinese." Journal of the Royal Asiatic Society of Great Britain and Ireland (New Series) 33.3: 447–460. 
Terjék, József (1969). "Fragments of the Tibetan Sutra of «The Wise and the Fool» from Tun-huang." Acta Orientalia Academiae Scientiarum Hungaricae 22.3: 289–334.

4th-century books